is one of the 10 wards in Sapporo, Hokkaidō, Japan. Minami-ku is directly translated as "south ward". Having the area of 657.48 km² in total, Minami-ku occupies 60 percent of the area of Sapporo.

Overview 
According to the jūminhyō (registry) in 2008, 149,139 people were living in Minami-ku. The total area of the ward is 657.48 km², which is the largest in Sapporo. 17 mountains including Mount Yoichi (1488.1 metres, the highest mountain in Sapporo) are included in the ward, along with part of the Shikotsu-Tōya National Park.

Sapporo's five wards: Chūō-ku, Toyohira-ku, Kiyota-ku, Nishi-ku, Teine-ku, have boundaries with Minami-ku, and four cities (Chitose, Otaru, Date, Eniwa), two towns (Kimobetsu, Kyōgoku), and a village (Akaigawa) also have boundaries.

History 

Originally, the area where currently Minami-ku is located has been famous for the hot springs in Jōzankei area and mines in Ishiyama area, and many pioneers and their families have settled from the outside of Hokkaidō. In 1918, the Jōzankei Railroad was opened for traffic from Shiroishi area to current Minami-ku area. In 1946, after the end of World War II, American army took over farms in Makomanai area and built a military facility called Camp Crawford.

The restoration of the Camp Crawford began in 1955, and camps of the Japan Ground Self-Defense Force were started to build. In 1972, Sapporo Winter Olympics was held in Sapporo, and a number of sports competitions were held in Makomanai area, including biathlon, cross-country skiing, figure skating, ice hockey, and the cross-country skiing portion of the Nordic combined events. In the same year, Sapporo was listed as one of the cities designated by government ordinance, and Minami-ku was established. The camp of the Self-Defense Force has been one of the venues of the Sapporo Snow Festival, however, it was abolished and moved to the Sapporo Satoland site located in Higashi-ku, in 2005.

Transportation
 Sapporo Municipal Subway
 Namboku Line: Sumikawa - Jieitai-Mae - Makomanai

Education

Universities

Public
 Sapporo City University

Private
 Hokkaido Tokai University

Colleges
 Koen Gakuen Women's Junior College
 Hokkaido Bunkyo University Junior College

High schools

Public
 Hokkaido Sapporo Nanryou High School
 Hokkaido Sapporo Keihoku Commercial High School
 Hokkaido Sapporo Moiwa High School

Private
  Hokusei Gakuen Girls' Junior & Senior High School - 北星学園女子中学高等学校
Sapporo Shinyo High School
 Hokkaido Bunkyo University Meisei High School
 Tokai University Daiyon High School

Points of interest 
 Jozankei hot springs resort - a number of hotels and resorts with hot springs.
 Makomanai Park - a park including the Makomanai Ice Arena, Makomanai Open Stadium, and Sapporo Salmon Museum. 
 Sapporo Art Park - a park with many public arts. 
 Monami Park - a park including a mine of the Sapporo Nanseki (soft stone).
 Mount Moiwa - observation deck and ski resort.
 Mount Moiwa Ropeway

Sources

External links 
 Minami-ku, official homepage 

 
Wards of Sapporo